Vakarų ekspresas is the largest regional newspaper of Klaipėda city, Lithuania with daily circulation of 15,000–20,000 copies.

Vakarų ekspresas is published daily, except for Sundays. Its supplements include Eteris (TV guide), Autosalonas (automobiles), Sveikata (health), Litas prie lito (money advice), Jūros vartai (regional news), Kultūros uostas (culture) and Šeštadienis (Saturday). The newspaper is distributed in Klaipėda, Gargždai, Skuodas, Mažeikiai, Palanga, Kretinga, Plungė, Telšiai and Vilnius.

Established on September 15, 1990, Vakarų ekspresas developed from weekly Mažoji Lietuva (named after Lithuania Minor). On July 1, 1996, JSC Mažoji Lietuva was transformed into UAB Brolių Tomkų leidyba. In 1999, a web page was started  http://www.vakaru-ekspresas.lt, which was changed to http://www.ve.lt in 2004.

In 1988 July 7, a group of young journalists and technical workers who worked at the then LKP Klaipėda City Executive Committee publication "Tarybinė Klaipėda" published the publication "News of Reorganization" in a xenographic way after the first meeting of Sąjūdis activists. Its circulation was 30 copies. From the second issue, the name of the publication was changed to "Mažoji Lietuva". At that time, the editorial staff of the weekly newspaper was located in two cities: Klaipėda and Vilnius. The aim was that it would be a youthful, conservative canon-breaking, brave, witty, colorful newspaper. It was also a national, republican political weekly. 1989-1991 the circulation of this weekly varied from 30,000 to 50,000 copies. "Mažoji Lietuva" was the most popular in Lithuania for a year and a half, even more popular than "Rebirth".

Prominent journalists 
Ramunė Visockytė
Vytautas Čepas
Gintaras Vaičekauskas

References

External links
 Official website

Publications established in 1990
Lithuanian-language newspapers
Daily newspapers published in Lithuania
1990 establishments in Lithuania
Newspapers published in Klaipėda